Cédric Lavanne (born 13 November 1980 in Pointe-à-Pitre, Guadeloupe) is a French athlete who specialises in the 110 meter hurdles and 60 meter hurdles . Lavanne competed at the 2003 IAAF World Indoor Championships and the 2006 IAAF World Indoor Championships.

Competition record

References

French male hurdlers
1980 births
French people of Guadeloupean descent
People from Pointe-à-Pitre
Living people
Athletes (track and field) at the 2001 Mediterranean Games
Athletes (track and field) at the 2005 Mediterranean Games
Athletes (track and field) at the 2009 Mediterranean Games
Mediterranean Games competitors for France